Gad Avigad (Hebrew גד אביגד; born 1930) is an Israeli biochemist.

Biography
Avigad was born in 1930 in Jerusalem. At 17, he joined the ranks of the Palmach. He studied at the Hebrew University of Jerusalem, receiving a doctorate in 1958.

Avigad was Associate Professor of Biochemistry at the Hebrew University and, in 1970, moved to the United States and taught at the Robert Wood Johnson Medical School in New Jersey.

Awards
In 1957, Avigad was awarded the Israel Prize, in exact sciences, jointly with Shlomo Hestrin and David Sidney Feingold, with whom he studied.

References

See also
 List of Israel Prize recipients

Hebrew University of Jerusalem alumni
Academic staff of the Hebrew University of Jerusalem
Israel Prize in exact science recipients
Israel Prize in exact science recipients who were biochemists
Israeli biochemists
Israeli Jews
Scientists from Jerusalem
1930 births
Living people